Alexandru Buhuşi (born 31 May 1990) is a Romanian football player.

References

External links
 

1990 births
Living people
Sportspeople from Iași
Romanian footballers
Romania under-21 international footballers
Association football midfielders
Liga I players
Liga II players
CS Brănești players
FC Politehnica Iași (1945) players
FC Petrolul Ploiești players
CS Știința Miroslava players